The following is a list of films originally produced and/or distributed theatrically by Paramount Pictures and released in the 1950s.

References

External links
 Paramount Pictures Complete Library

 1950-1959
1950s in American cinema
Lists of 1950s films